The Learning of Jim Benton is a 1917 American silent Western film directed by Clifford Smith and starring Roy Stewart, Fritzi Ridgeway and Walter Perry.

Cast
 Roy Stewart as Jim Benton
 Fritzi Ridgeway as Evelyn Hastings
 Walter Perry as Joe
 Ed Brady as Harvey Knowles
 Thornton Edwards as Sid Harvey

References

Bibliography
 Langman, Larry. A Guide to Silent Westerns. Greenwood Publishing Group, 1992.

External links
 

1917 films
1917 Western (genre) films
American black-and-white films
Films directed by Clifford Smith
Silent American Western (genre) films
Triangle Film Corporation films
1910s English-language films
1910s American films